William Ryan was an English professional footballer who played as a goalkeeper. He started his career with Football League First Division side Burnley, and made one appearance for the club in the 2–1 victory over Derby County at Turf Moor on 3 October 1892. He did not play again, but remained on the staff at Burnley until November 1894 when he left to join nearby Padiham.

References

Year of birth missing
Year of death missing
English footballers
Association football goalkeepers
Burnley F.C. players
Padiham F.C. players
English Football League players